Pullman Yard or Pullman Yards is a former industrial complex in the Kirkwood neighborhood of Atlanta, comprising a plot of  used by the Pratt Engineering Company from 1904 and the Pullman Company from 1926 to 1955. Southern Iron and Equipment Company purchase the yard in 1955 for train manufacture and repair. The site was placed on the Atlanta Preservation Center's endangered places list in 2001, although it has been contested that they have the authority to do so. As Pratt-Pullman Yard, it is a contributing site to the 2009 designation of the Kirkwood Historic District on the National Register of Historic Places.

History 
Before Pratt Engineering Company purchased the land, the property was used as farmland. The Pratt Engineering Company original use was a sugar and fertilizer processing plant. In 1926, the Pullman company purchased the property to repair their railroad sleeper cars. They spent 1 million dollars  on renovations.

World War I 
In World War I the land was used for munitions manufacturing.

Landmark status 
In 2017 the Atlanta Urban Design Commission nominated the historic site as a landmark site.

Present day 
In 2017, Atomic Entertainment, a film production company based in Los Angeles, made headlines when they were awarded The Pratt Pullman Yard development. The 27-acre historic site was to supposedly become a creative "city within a city" that would feature state-of-the-art commercial and residential hotels, offices and apartment properties, expansive food courts, restaurants/bars, entertainment soundstages, and a cultural community with hiking trails and bike paths along the expansive property to showcase the beauty and historical significance of the space. As of early 2022, few of these plans have materialized and the site is primarily rented out for temporary events.

Ahead of its 2022 season, the Fan Controlled Football league constructed a 1,500-seat arena on the site.

Filming location 

Pullman Yards has been the filming location of many movies and television series. List of projects that used the Pratt-Pullman Yard:

 Brooklyn (HBO)
 Amazing Stories
 American Soul
 Baby Driver
 Bad Boys for Life
 Black Lightning
 Boss Level
 Divergent
 Doom Patrol
 Good Girls
 Instant Family
 Kevin (Probably) Saves the World
 MacGyver
 Revolution of One
 Step Up (Season 2)
 The Hunger Games
 The Originals
 The Outsider
 The Resident
 Valor
 Ford Motor Company commercial
 Georgia Power commercial
 Janelle Monáe Bustle event
 Lil Yachty for Monday Night Football
 Fast and Furious 5

References 

National Register of Historic Places in Atlanta
Infrastructure on the National Register of Historic Places